Jare Henrik Tiihonen is the fifth studio album by Finnish rapper Cheek. It was released on 13 May 2009. The album peaked at number one on the Official Finnish Album Chart.

Track listing

Charts

Release history

References

2009 albums
Cheek (rapper) albums